The Azerbaijan Cup 2013–14 is the 22nd season of the annual cup competition in Azerbaijan. The competition started on 23 October 2012 with three games in the First Round, with the fourth being played a week later on 30 October due to Ağsu's ground being used for the 2013 Azerbaijan Supercup. The 10 Azerbaijan Premier League teams entering at the last 16 stage, joining the four First round winners. The competition is scheduled to end on 28 May 2014 with the Final. Neftchi Baku are the defending champions. Twenty teams are scheduled to compete in this year's competition. The winner of the competition will qualify for the first qualifying round of the 2014–15 UEFA Europa League.

First round
The games were played on the 23 and 30 October 2013.

Second round
The four winners from the First Round joined the remaining ten teams from the Azerbaijan Premier League. All the games were played on 4 December 2013.

Quarterfinals
The eight winners from the Second Round are drawn into four two-legged ties. The first legs were played on 12 March 2014 with the second legs taking place a week later on 19 March 2014.

Semifinals
The four quarterfinal winners are drawn into two two-legged semifinal ties. The first legs are to be played on 16 April 2014. The second legs are scheduled for 24 April.

Final

Scorers
3 goals:

 Victor Mendy, Gabala
 Mbilla Etame, Khazar Lankaran

2 goals:

 Nizami Hajiyev, Gabala
 Asif Mammadov, Inter Baku
 Alexander Iashvili, Inter Baku
 Sadio Tounkara, Khazar Lankaran
 Reynaldo, Qarabağ
 Vusal Garaev, Ravan Baku
 Elvin Adısirinli, Shusha
 Rashad Eyyubov, Simurq

1 goal:

 Elmin Chobanov, Araz
 David Janalidze, Araz
 Tarlan Khalilov, Araz
 Bakhtiyar Soltanov, Araz
 Javid Huseynov, Baku
 Aleksandar Šolić, Baku
 Risto Ristović, Baku
 Abdulwaheed Afolabi, Gabala
 Leonardo, Gabala
 Marat Izmailov, Gabala
 Danijel Subotić, Gabala
 Abdulla Abatsiyev, Inter Baku
 Ruslan Amirjanov, Inter Baku
 Vagif Javadov, Inter Baku
 Matija Špičić, Inter Baku
 Álvaro Silva, Khazar Lankaran
 Nildo, Khazar Lankaran
 Kamran Häsänzadä, Lokomotiv-Bilajary
 Tural Gurbatov, Lokomotiv-Bilajary
 Samir Babayev, Mil-Muğan
 Nicat Färäcli, Mil-Muğan
 Elşän Hacıyev, Mil-Muğan
 Elxan Mämmädov, Mil-Muğan
 Elnur Mämmädov, Mil-Muğan
 Arzuman Väliyev, MOIK Baku
 Bahodir Nasimov, Neftchi Baku
 Araz Abdullayev, Neftchi Baku
 Bruno, Neftchi Baku
 Flavinho, Neftchi Baku
 Samir Masimov, Neftchi Baku
 Ernest Nfor, Neftchi Baku
 Ruslan Qurbanov, Neftchi Baku
 Murad Aghakishiyev, Qaradağ
 Novruz Alakbarov, Qaradağ
 Ilham Allahverdiyev, Qaradağ
 Anar Hasanov, Qaradağ
 Rufat Mamedov, Qaradağ
 Ivan Pecha, Ravan Baku
 Elnur Abdulov, Ravan Baku
 Rashad Abdullayev, Ravan Baku
 Thiago Miracema, Ravan Baku
 Elvin Hasanliyev, Ravan Baku
 Juan Varea, Ravan Baku
 Mahiddin Agamov, Shahdag
 Abdulla Zilpokarov, Shahdag
 Israfil Qarayev, Shusha
 Muhammad Halilov, Shusha
 Slavik Alkhasov, Sumgayit

Notes
Qarabağ have played their home games at the Tofiq Bahramov Stadium since 1993 due to the ongoing situation in Quzanlı.

References

External links
Azerbaijan Cup at soccerway.com

Azerbaijan Cup seasons
Azerbaijan Cup
Azerbaijan Cup